Carla Schuessler is an American politician of the Republican Party. She is the member of the South Carolina House of Representatives representing District 61. SC House District 61 was held by Roger K. Kirby, but after redistricting created a new geographic District, Kirby ran for and ultimately won SC House District 101.

Schuessler defeated Democratic Nominee Ashlyn Preaux for South Carolina House of Representatives District 61.

Statements were issued by Henry McMaster, Governor of South Carolina who won his re-election bid, and Drew McKissick, chair of the South Carolina Republican Party.

References

Republican Party members of the South Carolina House of Representatives
Living people
21st-century American women politicians
Women state legislators in South Carolina
Year of birth missing (living people)
21st-century American politicians